Anne Cathrine Collett (19 February 1768 – 27 January 1846), was a Norwegian-Danish landowner. She was one of the wealthiest women in Denmark of her time. She owned Lundbygård and Oremandsgaard from 1827 until 1846.

Biography
Anne Cathrine Collett was born on 19 February 1768 into the wealthy Collett family of timber merchants in Christiania (now Oslo). Her parents were Peter Collett (1740–86) of Buskerud and Maren Kirstine Holmboe (1745–68). She married Peter Nicolaj Arbo who subsequently entered the family's company Collett & Søn.

The couple moved to Copenhagen where they lived in the Peschier House at Holmens Kanal 12. Her husband acquired the country house Aldershvile north of Copenhagen and the manors of Lundbygård and Oremandsgaard at Præstø. After his death in 1827, she ran the estates with the assistance of count Knuth.

She died on 27 January 1846. Having no children, she left her estate to her nephews Bernt Anker Collet and Peter Collet (1820-1860).

References

External links
 Anne Cathrine Collett at geni.com

19th-century Danish women landowners
19th-century Danish landowners
Norwegian landowners
Anne Cathrine
1768 births
1846 deaths